Results for Quarterfinals  of the 2009–10 Euroleague basketball tournament.

The quarterfinals will be played from March 23 to April 7, 2010. Team #1 (i.e., the group winner in each series) will host Games 1 and 2, plus Game 5 if necessary. Team #2 will host Game 3, plus Game 4 if necessary.

Bracket

Quarterfinals

Quarterfinal  1
Game 1

Game 2

Game 3

Game 4

Quarterfinal  2
Game 1

Game 2

Game 3

Game 4

Quarterfinal  3
Game 1

Game 2

Game 3

Game 4

Quarterfinal  4
Game 1

Game 2

Game 3

Game 4

External links
Results

Quarterfinals